The floor is lava is a game in which players pretend that the floor or ground is made of lava (or any other lethal substance, such as acid or quicksand), and thus must avoid touching the ground, as touching the ground would "kill" the player who did so. The players stay off the floor by standing on furniture or the room's architecture. The players generally may not remain still, and are required to move from one piece of furniture to the next. This is due to some people saying that the furniture is acidic, sinking, or in some other way time-limited in its use. The game can be played with a group or alone for self amusement. There may even be a goal, to which the players must race. The game may also be played outdoors in playgrounds or similar areas. Players can also set up obstacles such as padded chairs to make the game more challenging. This is a variation of an obstacle course.

Typically, any individual can start the game just by shouting "The floor is lava!" Any player remaining on the floor in the next few seconds is "out" and can not rejoin the game for some period of time.

There often are tasks, items or places that can "regenerate" lost body parts or health. Depending on the players, these could be embarrassing tasks, or simple things like finding a particular person.

In one version called "Hot Lava Monster", sometimes referred to as "Skies in the Ringuss", usually played on playgrounds, players must stay off the ground (sand, rubber, woodchips, etc.) and on the play equipment. The person who is playing the "monster" can be on the 'lava' with the objective of attempting to tag another player. The "monster" must try to tag or catch the other players. In some versions, the "monster" is not allowed to touch certain obstacles, such as wooden platforms or may only touch objects of a certain colour.  The "monster" must navigate across structures such as across playground slides, monkey bars, ropes courses, etc. instead of the main platform.

This game is similar to the traditional children's game "Puss in the Corner", or "Puss Wants a Corner", where children occupying the corner of a room are "safe", while the Puss, the player who is "It" in the middle of the room, tries to occupy an empty corner as the other players dash from one corner to another. This game was often played in school shelter-sheds in Victoria, with the bench-seats along the walls of the shelter-shed being used as platforms joining the corner, while players crossing the floor could be caught by the Puss.

In popular culture

 Ketchapp released an official mobile game adaptation of the activity in the summer of 2017, titled The Floor Is Lava.  
 The activity becomes the basis of a special, limited-time mode for Epic Games' battle royale game Fortnite: Battle Royale during its eighth season, where lava progressively begins to flood the main battle map due to a leak sprung by a volcano that formed at the start of that season. Players compete as smaller squads as they automatically gain building materials that they use to construct platforms to escape the lava while battling to be the last team standing.
 In 2020, Netflix released a TV show based on the game called Floor Is Lava, where three teams compete to win $10,000 in different challenges.

Board games
 "The Floor Is Lava" board game by Italian Cousins is only tangentially related to the folk game. 
 The Endless Games brand game of the same title contains accessories for a more traditional game.

Adult entertainment industry
Stormy Daniels stated that she'd heard dancers at the strip club Cinnamon's were only permitted to expose breasts and/or genitals when performing on a raised platform, and that they had to be dressed before their feet touched the venue's main floor. She described this rule as "The floor is lava".

Factual accuracy
By using the Stefan–Boltzmann law and taking convection into account, University of Leicester scientists have calculated that a high stakes version of the game would not be playable with actual lava, as the air above the lava would have a temperature too high for humans to survive for more than a few seconds and the sulfur dioxide would be toxic for them.

References

Further reading
 

Children's games
Party games